A constitutional referendum was held in Thailand on 7 August 2016. The charter offered only semi-democracy and was seen to tighten military rule in Thailand. However, it was approved by 61% of voters with a 59% turnout. A second proposal for the next prime minister to be jointly elected by senators and MPs was also approved. However, the opposition groups to the constitution were barred from formally campaigning against it by the military government, while the military government actively campaigned for its adoption.

Constitutional drafting
The primary difference between the 2016 constitution and the 2007 document was that the Senate would become a fully appointed chamber rather than a partially elected one during the 5 year "transitional period" stipulated in the charter. This was seen as an effort by the National Council for Peace and Order (NCPO) to retain influence once it has left office, as it will have the right to appoint the 250 members. The Senate would also be granted veto power over the House of Representatives on amending the constitution, and a Prime Minister will be allowed to be appointed from outside either house.

Conduct
The NCPO banned criticism of the draft constitution and prohibited monitoring of the referendum. Activists against the document were arrested, detained, and prosecuted in military courts, whilst voters who expressed their intention to vote against the draft were also arrested and prosecuted by the military regime.

350,000 canvassers were scheduled to be trained by the Constitutional Drafting Committee to campaign for the constitution, approximately four per village.

Opinion polls

Draft constitution

Election of the Prime Minister

Results
Turnout for the vote was at 59%. The vote was rejected in the pro-Thaksin Isan province and even more firmly in the three Muslim majority southern provinces. The ‘Yes’ camp accounted for 61.4 per cent of the voter turn-out, while the ‘No’ faction could garner only 38.6 per cent, with 94 per cent of the votes counted on the day after.

BBC reported that there are many cited reasons for the result, including repression on campaigning and criticizing the charter with only a few people that actually saw a copy. The drafters argued that it will address political corruption and help reform the country. Some trusted the military junta. Many voters were tired of endless political crisis and saw the charter as a way back to normality.

By province

Aftermath
The next task of the Constitutional Drafting Committee was to draw up organic laws governing the new political system. The military continued to stay in power past the royal succession, following the death of king Bhumibol. The draft constitution would under go six changes at the request of the new king, Maha Vajiralongkorn, which expanded his powers, before being ratified on 6 April 2017.

Political parties were expected to dissolve themselves and reform, possibly ending up as smaller parties, as the new voting system made it harder for larger parties to win an overall majority and more likely for a coalition government to be formed.

Elections were eventually held in 2019, with the Phalang Pracharat Party, a pro-junta party, forming a coalition government. Prayut Chan-o-cha, prime minister and leader of the military government, was elected prime minister of the new government, with his nomination being possible because the new constitution allowed non-members of parliament to become prime minister.

The new government will be subject to supervision by the unelected Senate as well as other constitutional bodies. Impeachment of politicians has also become easier. Future governments are also required to adhere to the 20-year plan by the military.

The military is expected to remain a significant actor in Thai politics for many years.

See also 
 August 2016 Thailand bombings

References

Constitutional referendum
2016 referendums
August 2016 events in Thailand
Constitution of Thailand
Constitutional referendums
2016
Voter suppression
2014 Thai coup d'état